Acacia baueri, commonly known as tiny wattle, is a shrub belonging to the genus Acacia and the subgenus Lycopodiifoliae that is native to an area along the coast in eastern Australia.

Description
Like most species of Acacia it has phyllodes rather than true leaves. The grey-green and terete phyllodes are quite leathery and are glabrous to sparsely hairy and have one longitudinal groove on each surface. It produces yellow flowers between July and September. The flat, thinly leathery seed pods that form after flowering are curved just a little and are usually straight-sided or have minimum constriction between the seeds. The seeds inside are arranged longitudinally and have a filiform funicle.

Taxonomy
The specific epithet honours the botanical artists Franz and Ferdinand Bauer.
Two known subspecies are recognised:
 Acacia baueri subsp. aspera, listed as vulnerable in New South Wales
 Acacia baueri subsp. baueri, listed as vulnerable in Queensland.

Distribution
It is found in coastal regions in central and northern New South Wales extending north from the Illawarra region and into south eastern Queensland. It is usually situated on plateaus made of sandstone in rocky, exposed or damp areas as a part of coastal heathland communities. It is found as far south as the Blue Mountains close to Sydney.

See also
 List of Acacia species

References

baueri
Flora of Queensland
Flora of New South Wales
Taxa named by George Bentham
Plants described in 1842